This is a list of champions in the Dream organization at each weight class. Dream was a Japanese mixed martial arts organization, originally promoted by Fighting and Entertainment Group, and over management of Glory Sports International since October 2012. The first two champions were crowned after the 2008 Lightweight and Middleweight Grand Prix, while the 2009 Welterweight and Featherweight GPs have crowned the champions at those weights. The 2010 Light Heavyweight Grand Prix crowned the first Dream Light Heavyweight Champion at Dream 16.  The 2011 World Bantamweight Grand Prix crowned the first ever Dream Bantamweight Champion at Dynamite!!! 2011.

Last champions

Title history

Heavyweight championship
Weight limit: Unlimited

{{small|'}}

Light heavyweight championshipWeight limit: Middleweight championshipWeight limit: Welterweight championshipWeight limit: Lightweight championshipWeight limit: Featherweight championshipWeight limit: Bantamweight championshipWeight limit: ''

Tournament winners

By nationality

The following include championship title holders or tournament winners by nationality.

See also
 List of current mixed martial arts champions
 List of Bellator MMA champions
 List of EliteXC champions
 List of Invicta FC champions
 List of ONE Championship champions
 List of Pancrase champions
 List of Pride champions
 List of PFL champions
 List of Shooto champions
 List of Strikeforce champions
 List of UFC champions
 List of WEC champions
 Mixed martial arts weight classes

References

Dream Champions, List Of